Paternoster Row was a street in the City of London that was a centre of the London publishing trade, with booksellers operating from the street. Paternoster Row was described as "almost synonymous" with the book trade. It was part of an area called St Paul's Churchyard.

The street was devastated by aerial bombardment during World War II. In 2003 the street was replaced with Paternoster Square, the modern home of the London Stock Exchange, although a City of London Corporation road sign remains in the square near where Paternoster Row once stood.

As far back as the 12th century, the road was known as Paternoster Row, as it was the main place in London where Paternoster beads were made by skilled craftsmen. The beads were popular with illiterate monks and friars at the time, who prayed 30 Paternoster prayers (Latin for "Our Father") three times a day as a substitute for the 150 psalms recited a day by literate monks.

Name
The street is supposed to have received its name from the fact that, when the monks and clergy of St Paul's Cathedral would go in procession chanting the great litany, they would recite the Lord's Prayer (Pater Noster being its opening line in Latin) in the litany along this part of the route. The prayers said at these processions may have also given the names to nearby Ave Maria Lane and Amen Corner.

An alternative etymology is the early traders, who sold a type of prayer bead known as a "pater noster".

History
The name of the street dates back at least to the 16th century.

Houses in St. Paul's Churchyard were damaged in the Great Fire of London in 1666, burning down the old St. Paul's Cathedral. When the new St. Paul's Cathedral was erected, booksellers returned after a number of years.

Gentleman Henry (Robert) Gunnell, Esq. (1724–1794) of Millbank, a senior officer in the House of Commons and House of Lords who worked the Tax Acts for the American Colonies with Prime Minister George Grenville and also Lord North, bought No.8 Paternoster Row in 1778 as one of his portfolio of properties and soon after gave it to his eldest son John Gunnell (1750–1796), a Westminster gentleman. John though seldom stayed at the house, as he lived mainly at Margate, Kent, and it was instead used as a literary venue by his father Henry (Robert) and his friends, where among other notable members, Jane Timbury would attend. Her stance as a novelist and poet later inspired Jane Austen in her career. Henry (Robert) Gunnell's fashion icon wife, Anne Rozea (1723–1795) of Duke's Court, St. Martin's Lane (situated where now the National Gallery cafe is located) was known for her attendance, reciting moving French poetry dressed in an exquisite mantua with ornate jubilee hat. Johann Christian Bach (1735–1782) and Sir Joshua Reynolds (1723-1792) were also known to have attended on occasion. Henry (Robert) had bought No.8 Paternoster Row from Philanthropist Sylvanus Hall, a successful London currier and leather goods craftsman (Guildhall Library) and also governor of both St. Thomas and Bridewell Hospitals, who owned two other houses on Paternoster Row and had earlier worked with the beautiful Anne Rozea at "Gunnell's Hat Warehouse" a fashion store at No.54 Chandois Street (next door to the Mercers Coventry Cross), Covent Garden, from the mid-1760s. There he oversaw the manufacture of fashionable hats, cloaks and silk garments and later married Henry (Robert) Gunnell and Anne Rozea's daughter, Ann Gunnell (1746–1804), at the church of St.Augustine, Watling Street, (02.Feb.1769) just east of St. Paul's cathedral. They lived at No.8 Paternoster Row for nine years, until her father bought it for his son John as part of his inheritance as mentioned in 1778. Ann and Sylvanus Hall then moved to a house on Golden Square, Soho. On 21 February 1776, at the Old Bailey, Jeremiah Pope was indicted for stealing 'six hundred pounds weight of lead piping' from the three properties (Nos. 8, 9, and 10) of Sylvanus Hall on Paternoster Row. Another well-known visitor to No.8 was Thomas Vanhagen, whose famous pastry shop was located beside Pauls Alley, St. Paul's Churchyard, facing the North Entrance and where many Londoners took their refreshment. Various caricatures of Vanhagen (British Museum) were published over the years. His daughter Charlotte married Henry (Robert) and Anne's son Henry Gunnell (1754–1823), also of the House of Commons, (10.Jul.1779) at the parish of St. Gregory by St. Paul's. The Gunnells eventually sold No.8 Paternoster Row in 1794. 

A bust of Aldus Manutius, writer and publisher, can be seen above the fascia of number 13. The bust was placed there in 1820 by Bible publisher Samuel Bagster.

It was reported that Charlotte Brontë and Anne Brontë stayed at the Chapter Coffeehouse on the street when visiting London in 1847. They were in the city to meet their publisher regarding Jane Eyre.

A fire broke out at number 20 Paternoster Row on 6 February 1890. Occupied by music publisher Fredrick Pitman, the first floor was found to be on fire by a police officer at 21:30. The fire alarm was sounded at St. Martin's-le-Grand and fire crews extinguished the flames in half an hour. The floor was badly damaged, with smoke, heat and water impacting the rest of the building.

This blaze was followed later the same year on 5 October by 'an alarming fire'. At 00:30 a fire was discovered at W. Hawtin and Sons, based in numbers 24 and 25. The wholesale stationers' warehouse was badly damaged by the blaze.

On 21 November 1894, police raided an alleged gambling club which was based on the first floor of 59 Paternoster Row. The club known both as the 'City Billiard Club' and the 'Junior Gresham Club' had been there barely three weeks at the time of the raid. Forty-five arrests were made, including club owner Albert Cohen.

On 4 November 1939, a large-scale civil defence exercise was held in the City of London. One of the simulated seats of fire was in Paternoster Row.

Trübner & Co. was one of the publishing companies on Paternoster Row.

Destruction during World War II
The street was devastated by aerial bombardment during the Blitz of World War II, suffering particularly heavy damage in the night raid of 29–30 December 1940, later characterised as the Second Great Fire of London, during which an estimated 5 million books were lost in the fires caused by tens of thousands of incendiary bombs.

After the raid a letter was written to The Times describing:

Another correspondent with the newspaper, Ernest W. Larby, described his experience of 25 years working on Paternoster Row:

The ruins of Paternoster Row were visited by Wendell Willkie in January 1941. He said, "I thought that the burning of Paternoster Row, the street where the books are published, was rather symbolic. They [the Germans] have destroyed the place where the truth is told".

Printers, publishers and booksellers based in Paternoster Row

Note: Before about 1762, premises in London had signs rather than numbers.

 The Tyger's Head – Christopher Barker (????), his son Robert Barker (1545–1629)
 The Star – Henry Denham (1564)
 The Brazen Serpent (1627–1650) – Robert Dawlman (1627–1635, 1635–1638, died 1659), Luke Fawne (1635–1638, 1639–1641), Samuel Gellibrand (1639–1641, 1641–1650)
 The Golden Ball/Ball (1650–1675) – Samuel Gellibrand (1654, 1655, 1656, 1661, 1667, 1669, 1673) (died 1675), two of his sons Edward Gellibrand (1676, 1678, 1679, 1680, 1681, 1685), John Gellibrand (1679–1685), F.? Gellibrand (1683)
 The Gun – F.? Brome (1683)
 The Bell – B. Crayle (1683)
 The Sun – G. Wells (1683)
 The Angel – Moses Pitt (1683)
 The Bear – O. Blagrave (1683)
 The Rose and Crown – R. Chiswell (1683)
 The Crane – E. Brewster (1683)
 The Peacock – Robert Clavel/Clavell (1683)
 The Three Pigeons – F.? Baker (1683)
 The Golden Lyon/Golden Lion – F.? Robinson (1683)
 The Red Lyon/Red Lion – H. Bonwick (1683)
 The Phoenix/Phœnix – H. Mortlock (1683), Ed. Giles (1683)
 The Three Flower-de-luces/Three Flower-de-Luces – H. Hatley (1683)
 The Bishopshead/Bishops Head/Bishops head – W. Kettilby (1683)
 The Princes Arms/Prince's Arms (Arms of the Prince of Wales) – Samuel Smith (1683, 1692, 1694, 1695, 1704, 1705), Benjamin Walford (1694, 1695, 1705), printers to the Royal Society
 The Globe – F.? Taylor (1683), T. Cooper (1740)
 The Ship (later No. 38–41) – B. Tooke (1683), John Taylor (1710–1719), his son William Taylor (1708, 1719–1724), subsequently Longmans (see No. 39)
 The Black Swan –  John and Awnsham Churchill –  possibly John Taylor (????), later his son William Taylor (????), subsequently Longmans (????) (see No. 39)
 The Crown – T. Rickerton (1721)
 The Dove – J. Batley (1723)

 No. 1 – J. Souter (1817), Jan Van Voorst (1851) (see No. 3)
 No. 2 – Orr and Co. (1851), J. W. Myers (~1800)
 No. 3 – Jan Van Voorst (1838) (see No. 1)
 No. 5 – Groombridge and Sons (c. 1845 to c. 1875)
 No. 6 Panyer Alley – R. Groombridge (prior to c. 1845)
  No. 10 – W. W. Gardner (1870/1)
 No. 9 – S. W. Partridge and Co. (1876)
 No. 11 – W. Brittain (1840)
 No. 12 – Trubner and Co. (1856)
 No. 13 - Talbot (1908)
 No. 15 – Samuel Bagster and Sons (1817, 1825, 1851, 1870)
 No. 16 – Alex Hogg (1780)
 No. 17 – Thomas Kelly (1840)
 No. 20 & 21 – F. Pitman, later F. Pitman Hart and Co. Ltd. (1904)
 No. 21 – J. Parsons (1792)
 No. 22 - The Electrical Review (1876–1897)
 No. 23 – Piper, Stephenson, and Spence (1857)
 No. 24 – George Wightman (1831)
 No. 25 – George Robinson, from 1763 to 1801, with John Roberts, 1763 to 1776
 No. 27 Ivy Lane – Walton and Maberly (also at No. 28) (1837-1857), Hodder & Stoughton (from 1868-06-16)
 No. 28 Upper Gower Street – Walton and Maberly (also at No. 27)
 No. 31 – Sheed & Ward (1926)
 No. 33 – Hamilton and Co. (1851)
 No. 37 – James Duncan (1825–1838), Blackwood and Sons (1851)
 No. 39 (see The Ship) – Longman, Hust, Rees, Orme, Brown and Green (1825), later Longman and Co. (1851), later Longmans, Green, and Co. (1866, 1899, 1902)
 No. 40 – West and Hughes (~1800)
 No. 47 – Baldwin, Cradock, and Joy (1817), Baldwin and Craddock, later Chambers (1891)
 No. 56 – The Religious Tract Society (1851)
 No. 60 – The Sunday School Union (1851) later Trübner & Co (1872)
 No. 62 – Eliot Stock (1893, 1910)
 No. 65 – Houlston and Stoneman
 C. Davis (1740)
 Hawes, Clarke and Collins (1771)
 Oxford University Press – Bible warehouse destroyed by fire in 1822, rebuilt c. 1880
 Sampson Low (after 1887)
 H. Woodfall & Co.
 Marshall Brothers Ltd., Keswick House, Paternoster Row, London
 Thomas Nelson
 Sherwood, Neely, and Jones (1817)
 R. Fenner (1817)
 Kent and Co. (1859)
 Hurst & Blackett
 Jackson & Walford
 Hutchinson & Co.
 Ralph Smith Kirby (1802)

Others based in Paternoster Row
 No. 34 – Boys Brigade London HQ
 No. 60 – Friendly Female Society, "for indigent widows and single women of good character, entirely under the management of ladies."

In popular culture
 The Siege of Paternoster Row was an anonymous 1826 booklet in verse, attacking the reliability of bankers.
 The Paternoster Gang are a trio of Victorian detectives aligned with the Doctor in the television series Doctor Who, so named because they are based in Paternoster Row.
 In the episode "Young England" of the 2016 television series Victoria, a stalker of Queen Victoria indicates that he lives on Paternoster Row. (Coincidentally, the actress playing Victoria in the series, Jenna Coleman, had appeared in several episodes of Doctor Who that featured the aforementioned Paternoster Gang.)
 The novel, The Last Bookshop in London, makes numerous references to Paternoster Row, and it mentions the destruction of the street during World War II.

See also
 History of London
 Doctors' Commons
 Fleet Street
 Longmans
 Paul's walk
 St. Paul's Cross
 Religious Tract Society

References

Further reading
 
  Dawlman (Robert)

External links

History of the City of London
Streets in the City of London
Bookshops in London